Juan Hospital (1893 – 21 August 1956) was an Argentine footballer who played as inside left. Hospital spent his entire career at Racing Club, where he won 19 titles during the most successful era of the club.

Nicknamed Pichín, Hospital started playing in Independiente then moving to Racing in 1912. Notable for his skills to dribble, he would consolidate as one of the most notable forwards during the golden age of the club, forming a memorable attacking line along with legends such as Alberto Ohaco, Alberto Marcovecchio, and Natalio Perinetti that became the all-time leading scorer in the history of the club. Morevoer, Hospital was one of the footballers that contributed to Racing earned the nickname Academia ("academy") during those years.

He played in seven matches for the Argentina national football team from 1912 to 1916. He was also part of Argentina's squad for the 1916 South American Championship.

Hospital died on August 21, 1956, at the age of 63.

Titles
Racing
 Primera División (8): 1913, 1914, 1915, 1916, 1917, 1918, 1919, 1921
 Copa Honor MCBA (3): 1913, 1915, 1917
 Copa Ibarguren (5): 1913, 1914, 1916, 1917, 1918
 Copa de Honor Cousenier (1): 1913 
 Copa Aldao (2): 1917, 1918

References

1893 births
1956 deaths
Argentine footballers
Argentina international footballers
Place of birth missing
Association football forwards